I'll Give a Million may refer to:

 I'll Give a Million (1935 film), an Italian comedy film
 I'll Give a Million (1938 film), an American romance film